In mathematics, Hua's lemma, named for Hua Loo-keng, is an estimate for exponential sums.

It states that if P is an integral-valued polynomial of degree k,  is a positive real number, and f a real function defined by

then

,

where  lies on a polygonal line with vertices

References

Lemmas
Analytic number theory